Naomh Molaise Gaels is a Gaelic Athletic Association club covering much of the northern area of County Sligo, comprising Cliffoney (Ahamlish) and part of the Drumcliffe/Maugherow parishes. The club is a combination of a number of older clubs, including Grange, Cliffoney and Maugherow, and had fielded as Grange–Cliffoney before adopting the present name in 2003. Currently the champions of the Dr Taheny Cup for the minor A championship, a first-time achievement for the club.

Cyril Haran played for the club when it was known as Grange and was later a coach and club president.

Notable players
Cyril Haran (as Grange)
Mattie Hoey, former Sligo captain who won a Connacht Senior Football Championship in 1975, played for Connacht in the Railway Cup and listed as number 12 in a 2020 Irish Independent list of top players over the previous 50 years (ahead of Dessie Sloyan)

Haran (president) and Hoey (chairman) were both still involved with the club, as of 2011.

Honours
N.B. Honours prior to 2003 won as Grange unless otherwise stated.

 Sligo Intermediate Football Championship: (5)
 1981, 1994, 2001, 2008, 2016, 2022
 Sligo Junior Football Championship: (8)
 1959, 1969, 1975, 2001 (Maugherow - 1933, 1941, 1991, Northern Gaels - 1982)
 Sligo Under 20 Football Championship: (1)
 1977
 Sligo Minor A Football Championship: (2)
 2018, 2020
 Sligo Minor Football Championship: (1)
 (Cliffoney - 1945)
 Sligo Under-16 Football Championship: (2)
 2006, 2017
 Sligo Under 14 Football Championship: (1)
 2017
 Sligo Senior Football League (Division 1): (1)
 2011
 Sligo Intermediate Football League Division 3 (ex Div. 2): (3)
 1987, 2001, 2008
 Sligo Intermediate Football League (Division 4): (1)
 2008
 Sligo Junior Football League (Division 5) (4)
 1973, 1974, 2000, 2007
 Kiernan Cup: (3)
 1984, 1997, 1998
 Benson Cup: (2)
 1987, 1994
 UEFA Champions League : (1)
 1990

References

Gaelic games clubs in County Sligo